Trương Gia Bình (born 1956 in Nghệ An Province) is a Vietnamese businessman. He is best known as the co-founder, chairman and CEO of the Vietnamese technology company FPT Corporation. Bình is also the vice president of The Asian-Oceanian Computing Industry Organization (ASOCIO), Chairman of Vietnam Software Association (VINASA).

Early life
Trương Gia Bình was born on 1956 in Nghệ An Province. His father, Truong Gia Tho, was a doctor in Hanoi. Binh attended Chu Van An high school in Vietnam, and then went to the Soviet Union for college. He graduated from the Faculty of Mechanics and Mathematics, Lomonosov Moscow State University in 1978. He obtained his PhD in 1982 from the same university. In 1991, Bình was recognized as an associate professor by the State of Vietnam.

Career
On September 13, 1988, Bình and 12 Vietnamese scientists founded the Food Processing Technology company, the predecessor of FPT. He became the head of the Corporation for Financing and Promoting Technology, Vietnam's earliest information technology firm, in 1990.

In March 2002, after the equitization of FPT, Bình became the chairman and chief executive officer (CEO) of FPT Corporation. Afterwards, he led the firm in its expansion from its origins as an internet service provider to other areas such as software outsourcing for Japanese companies.

In 2006, his company opened FPT University, Vietnam's first private university; he also took up a position as the chairman of its managing board. He is speculated to be the richest person in Vietnam; as of January 2007, the value of his stake in FPT alone is VND2.6 trillion (US$164 million; 5,117,280 shares at VND525,000), according to the company's own prospectus. Bình himself is reportedly "tired" of the rumours.

On July 16, 2012, Trương Gia Bình was appointed to a member of the National Council for Sustainable Development and Competitiveness Building. The council, chaired by Vietnam's Deputy Prime Minister Nguyễn Thiện Nhân, is tasked with developing strategies and key policies to set orientations and a legal framework for the country's sustainable development in the next decade.

Personal life
Trương Gia Bình was first married to Vo Hanh Phuc. She is the daughter of General Võ Nguyên Giáp, a Vietnam People's Army general and politician. Giáp was VPA's Commander-in-Chief (1944–1976), Minister of Defence (1946–1980), deputy prime minister (1954–1991). Being the deputy prime minister in charge of science and technology from 1982 to 1991, Giáp lent a lot of help to Bình in founding FPT.

The couple had one daughter.

Honors and public recognition
In February 2010, Bình was voted by the Post Newspaper, the voice of the Ministry of Information & Communications and ICT journalists from over 30 popular newspapers in Vietnam as one of the Vietnam's Top 10 ICT Persons of the Decade (2000–2009).

In 2013, Trương Gia Bình was awarded Nikkei Asia Prize 2013. Dr. Trương is the first Vietnamese entrepreneur to be honored by Nikkei Inc. in 18 years. Bình received the award in the category of regional growth for having contributed to the development of his own company but also to the development of IT business in Vietnam. He set up a software industry organization and a university to foster IT experts.

References

Living people
Vietnamese businesspeople
Vietnamese expatriates in the Soviet Union
1956 births
Winners of the Nikkei Asia Prize